The following is a big list of the 20 largest settlements reached between the United States Department of Justice and pharmaceutical companies from 1991 to 2012, ordered by the size of the total settlement. The settlement amount includes both the civil (False Claims Act) settlement and criminal fine. Glaxo's $3 billion settlement included the largest civil False Claims Act settlement on record, and Pfizer’s $2.3 billion ($3.5 billion in 2022) settlement including a record-breaking $1.3 billion criminal fine. Legal claims against the pharmaceutical industry have varied widely over the past two decades, including Medicare and Medicaid fraud, off-label promotion, and inadequate manufacturing practices. With respect to off-label promotion, specifically, a federal court recognized off-label promotion as a violation of the False Claims Act for the first time in Franklin v. Parke-Davis, leading to a $430 million settlement.

See also
Vaccine hesitancy
Pharmaceutical fraud
List of off-label promotion pharmaceutical settlements

References 

Product liability
Lists of lawsuits
Medical controversies
Pharmaceutical industry in the United States
Drug advertising
Drug policy of the United States
Social problems in medicine
Corruption in the United States